"I Love Her" is a song recorded by American R&B singer Marques Houston. It is the first single from Houston's fourth studio album Mr. Houston. The song features a rap verse from American rapper Jim Jones.

Chart performance

References

2009 singles
Marques Houston songs
Jim Jones (rapper) songs
2009 songs
Universal Records singles
Songs written by Marques Houston
Songs written by Jim Jones (rapper)
The Ultimate Group singles